Delinquent Parents is a 1938 American crime film directed by Nick Grinde and written by Nicholas T. Barrows and Robert St. Claire. The film stars Doris Weston, Maurice Murphy, Helen MacKellar, Terry Walker, Richard Tucker and Charlotte Treadway. The film was released on July 15, 1938, by Progressive Pictures.

Plot
In the closing days of the Great War, Edith Ellis secretly marries Charles Wharton Jr., a young army lieutenant from an influential family. The Armistice of 11 November 1918 occurs just prior to her husband's sailing to France, his influential family successfully seeks to have their weakling son's marriage annulled. Edith is injured in an automobile accident with Edith and her family keeping her pregnancy secret, putting her child up for adoption.

Edith's daughter is adopted and raised as Carol Caldwell, but in a fit of rage her adoption is revealed to her circle of friends by her former friend. Shamed by not knowing she was adopted, Carol cruelly turns her back on her adopted parents and works as a nightclub singer where she attracts a young crowd to the establishment. Carol's adopted parents turn to their friend Edith Ellis, now an unmarried Judge who doesn't know that Carol is really her daughter.

More complications ensue when Carol's nightclub is secretly owned by a major criminal and Carol is threatened with being charged with contributing to the delinquency of minors.

Cast          
Doris Weston as Carol Wharton Caldwell
Maurice Murphy as Bruce Jefferson
Helen MacKellar as Judge Edith Ellis
Terry Walker as Cousin Betty
Richard Tucker as Harry Jefferson
Charlotte Treadway as Mrs. Harry Jefferson
Morgan Wallace as Charles Wharton
Marjorie Reynolds as Edythe Ellis
Theodore von Eltz as Carson
Walter Young as Joseph Caldwell
Sibyl Harris as Katherine Caldwell
Carlyle Moore Jr. as Charles Wharton Jr.
Janet Young as Mrs. Mihom
Byron Foulger as Herbert Ellis
Virginia Brissac as Mrs. Herbert Ellis
Harry Hayden as Mayor Wharton
Betty Blythe as Mrs. Wharton
Marge Champion as Dancer

References

External links
 

1938 films
1930s English-language films
American crime films
1938 crime films
Films directed by Nick Grinde
American black-and-white films
1930s American films